FC Basel started the 2007–08 season, the 115th season in their existence and 13th consecutive in the top flight of Swiss football, with various warm-up matches against Swiss lower league teams as well as Austrian Bundesliga, German Bundesliga, Scottish Premier League and French Ligue 1 clubs. FCB were looking to win the Swiss championship title for the first time since 2005 and regain the cup title that they won the year before. They also had the opportunity to compete in the UEFA Cup.

Overview
At the beginning of the 2007–08 season, Basel strengthened their team by signing Swiss internationalists Benjamin Huggel from Eintracht Frankfurt, Marco Streller from VfB Stuttgart and David Degen on loan from Borussia Mönchengladbach. Carlitos transferred from Benfica in for an estimated €1.5 million (CHF 1,610,000). Five young talents were brought up from the under-21 team. In the other direction, fans' favourites Ivan Rakitić transferred to Schalke 04 (for an estimated CHF 4,830,000) and Mladen Petrić joined Borussia Dortmund (for an estimated CHF 5,635,000). Influential defender Boris Smiljanić returned to his former club, Grasshoppers.

During the winter break, highly rated Switzerland U-21 defender Beg Ferati arrived at St. Jakob-Park from feeder club Concordia Basel on a three-and-a-half-year contract. He was joined by midfielder Marko Perović from Red Star Belgrade and veteran striker Vratislav Lokvenc, on loan from Red Bull Salzburg. Also during the winter break Felipe Caicedo transferred to Manchester City on a four-and-a-half year deal with a £5.2 million transfer fee (CHF 10 million), which made his sale one of the highest transfers in the history of the Swiss League.

The campaign

Domestic league
Basel's priority for the season was to win the league championship. The Swiss Super League season began on 22 July. Basel's first game was at home to FC Zürich which was won 1–0. In the fourth and sixth round of the championship, Basel suffered two defeats, 1–5 against BSC Young Boys and 0–2 against Grasshopper Club, and slid down to the fourth position in the league table. It took them two months before they climbed back to the leading position. In this period they won nine and drew two of eleven games. Basel suffered a home defeat against Xamax directly before the winter break and the suffered another defeat in the away match against Young Boys directly as the second half of the season began. Nevertheless Basel stayed in top position in the league table until virtually the end of the championship, slipping to second position twice. The first time as they lost an away match against Luzern and the second time after an away draw against Aarau. In the last eight games of the season, Basel achieved only four victories and four draws. But the team played strong enough to regain the lead. Basel won the Swiss Super League for the first time since 2005 on the 10 May 2008 at St. Jakob-Park after a 2-0 win over their main title threats BSC Young Boys.

The championship decision was made in the last game of the season. FCB needed only a point from the match to win the Championship, however if YB won then they would have become champions. This was exactly the same situation as the end of the 2005–06 season, then the final match was between Basel and Zürich then. The painful memories of losing the league on the last day of the season in 2006 and the resulting 2006 Basel hooligan incident seemed to spur FCB on. Basel took an early lead through Valentin Stocker and a second goal scored by Marco Streller just a few minutes later wrapped up the victory well before half time.

FCB obtained 74 points to win the championship and qualify for Champions League second qualifying round. They were four points above YB with 70 points and 18 points ahead of third placed FCZ, who obtained 56 points. These two teams qualified to UEFA Cup second qualifying round. The bottom placed Thun suffered relegation and second last St. Gallen advanced to the relegation/promotion play-pff against Bellinzona. Bellinzona won the play-off and were promoted FCSG suffered relegation.

Domestic Cup
Basel's clear aim for the 2007–08 Swiss Cup was to retain the title that they had won the year before. The 10 clubs from the Swiss Super League as well as the 17 clubs of the Swiss Challenge League qualified directly for the cup and entered in the round of 64. 

FC Léchelles
Basel were paired away against 5th tier FC Léchelles on 19 September 2007 and won with ease. Carlitos, Scott Chipperfield and Eduardo each scored two goals and David Degen, Kōji Nakata and team captain Ivan Ergić each scored one as Basel achieved the end result 9–0.

SC Binningen
They then faced local club SC Binningen, also from the 5th tier, away from home at the newly built Spiegelfeld stadium, on 20 October. This time captain Ivan Ergić scored two goals and David Degen, Carlitos, Eduardo and Benjamin Huggel each added another as Basel cruised to a 6–1 victory.

Grasshopper Club
Basel then faced a much tougher test in the third round. An away match against the Grasshoppers at the Letzigrund on 25 October. The game was equally balanced in a first half low on events. The best chance came from a bicycle kick from Scott Chipperfield. In the second half Basel put on the pressure and after 55 minutes were not awarded a penalty despite a foul on Streller. But nonetheless Basel won 1–0. The goal coming frpm the penalty spot, scored by Daniel Majstorović after a hand-ball from Guillermo Vallori.

Stade Nyonnais
On 15 December, third tier Stade Nyonnais travelled to St. Jakob-Park for the quarter-final. Basel played with second goalkeeper Louis Crayton in place of Franco Costanzo, who was rested in advance of the Uefa Cup game against Hamburger SV, which was a few days later. But it was the Nyonnaise keeper Mathey who stole the show, saving four, five good attempts alone in the first half. He kept the game goalless to halftime. Stade Nyonnais fought hard as Basel added more pressure. Eren Derdiyok eventually put the hosts one up in the 53rd minute and they kept pressing giving keeper Mathey more chances to show his abilities. Derdiyok finished the game off with another goal in the 90th minute.

Thun
The semi-final saw Basel beat FC Thun 1–0 on 27 February. Again played in the St. Jakob-Park Vratislav Lokvenc, who was on loan from Red Bull Salzburg scored the only game of the match as early as the 12th minute.

Bellinzona
Basel were heavy favourites before the kick-off, not just because they were facing a lower league side but as the cup final was also being held in their home stadium, which is where UEFA Euro 2008 kicked off nine weeks later. It was Bellinzona, though, who had the better of the opening stages with Basel goalkeeper Franco Costanzo called into action several times. However, Eren Derdiyok scored the opening goal on 31 minutes to calm down things for the Swiss league leaders. Bellinzona equalised after 58 minutes through Christian Pouga but their euphoria was short-lived as they conceded three times in as many minutes to lose any chance of causing an upset. Four minutes later Daniel Majstorovic headed in, substitute Marco Streller made it 3-1 and fellow Swiss international Benjamin Huggel put the match beyond doubt in the 66th minute to make the final scoreline 4–1 in Basel's favour. Basel won the Swiss Cup for the second consecutive season after beating second-tier side AC Bellinzona 4–1 at St. Jakob-Park on 6 April 2008. 

Conclusion
Basel's aim for the Swiss Cup was to retain the title and this was achieved with ease.

Europe
Because Basel entered the 2007–08 UEFA Cup in the second qualifying round, the club set their aim as to reach the group stage. The draw was held on Friday, 3 August 2007 at 13:00 CET in Nyon, Switzerland. It was conducted by UEFA General Secretary David Taylor and Giorgio Marchetti, UEFA's director of professional football. The matches were to be played on 16 and 30 August 2007.

Mattersburg
Basel were drawn against a tough opponent in the form of SV Mattersburg of Austria. Mattersburg were Austrian league leaders at the time, with an unbeaten run. The first leg was held at the St. Jakob-Park on 16 August 2007 under referee Martin Ingvarsson of the Swedish Football Association. Basel began strongly, had their fifth corner in the twelfth minute but Scott Chipperfield's good shot was deflected only a short distance wide of the goal. Mattersburg's defender Cem Atan saw his second yellow card after just 17 minutes and was sent off. Nevertheless it was the Austrian team who shortly afterwards took the lead. Basel's defender Nakata deflected a shot into their own goal after 20 minutes. Basel's reply was immediate, capitan Ergić equalised just three minutes later. Mattersburg goalkeeper Robert Almer played strongly, showing six or seven good saves and denying Basel the lead. This eventually came in the 57th minute from Caicedo. Mattersburg were overwhelmed but their keeper kept showing good work. In the end the 2–1 victory meant a lot of work, but too little yield.

Return match
Basel won the tie straight off with an easy away win in the Pappelstadion on 30 August, under referee Selçuk Dereli from the Turkish Football Federation. Felipe Caicedo put the visitors one up after 22 minutes, captain Ergić added a second after 36 and Streller netted the third after 40. Basel had decided the game before half time and they played the rest of the game in a lower gear. Eight minutes after the break Carlitos increased the score to the final score of 4–0 and 6–1 on aggregate.

FK Sarajevo
In the next round, Basel were drawn against Bosnian minnows FK Sarajevo in the first round. The first leg was played on 20 September in front of 6,000 spectators in the Asim Ferhatović Hase Stadium in Sarajevo under referee Lajuks of the Latvian Football Federation. Carlitos put the visitors in the lead in the 11th minute and captain Ergić added a second after 63 minutes. Basel again played the rest of the game in a lower gear. In the third minute of added time Semjon Milošević scored for the hosts, but this was much too late to make a difference.

Return match
The return leg was played on 4 October in the St. Jakob-Park. Basel started quickly. Carlitos netted the first goal in the eighth minute and added a second just one minute later. Then came Swiss international Streller double into the scorers list, scoring his first in the 19th minute and his second ten minutes later. This was the half time score. Basel played as though it was a friendly match, not wishing to hurt themselves or be injured by their opponents, so not really entering the tackles. Huggel scored the teams fifth goal on 75 minutes and then Felipe Caicedo added a sixth as the game entered the added time. The game ended 6–0 and Basel won 8–1 on aggregate.

Basel advanced to the group stage. Due to the fact that they had reached the group stage their aim was modified and was set as to remain in the competition over the winter break. The draw for the group stage, which was conducted by UEFA's director of professional football Giorgio Marchetti and Michele Centenaro, UEFA's head of club competitions, was held on Tuesday, 9 October 2007 at 12:00 CET in Nyon, Switzerland. Basel were then drawn into a group of death, Group D, alongside Brann, Dinamo Zagreb, Hamburger SV and Rennes, all of which were ranked within the top three of their respective leagues at the start of the stage.

Rennes
The first group match was at home, in front of a small crowd of just 11,407 spectators, on 27 October  against French team Rennes under referee Nicola Rizzoli from the Italian Football Federation. Basel started well into the match and almost worked themselves an early advantage when Ivan Ergić's fierce free-kick was tipped around the post by Rennes goalkeeper Patrice Luzi. Rennes were second best at the beginning, but gradually began to work their way into the game with Franco Costanzo having to move quickly to save Sylvain Marveaux's effort on 27 minutes, before watching Bruno Cheyrou's powerful shot sail over the bar three minutes later. However, Basel ended the first half as they had begun it, strong. Scott Chipperfield hit a long-range shot that was well caught by Luzi and minutes later Felipe Caicedo fired an effort narrowly wide of the left-hand post. After the restart, Rennes again worked Costanzo, but the goalkeeper was more than equal to Jimmy Briand's strike. The decisive moment came soon after as Marco Streller jumped higher than the Rennes defencef's to head in Chipperfield's corner. Caicedo almost doubled Basel's lead soon after, with a shot out of the distance that flew narrowly wide. Having survived that, Rennes pressed for an equaliser but the closest they came was a shot by Mickaël Pagis that drifted wide as Basel achieved their victory.

Dinamo Zagreb
Their next game was away to Dinamo Zagreb, in the Maksimir Stadium, in which Basel earned a valuable away point thanks to on form goalkeeper Franco Costanzo, who kept the game at 0–0 for 90 minutes. On the 8 November, in front of 28,000 spectators, FC Basel goalkeeper Costanzo was in inspired form as the Swiss side earned a valuable point. The Argentinian keeper twice tipped good drives over the bar to keep the visitors in the match, but the hosts only had themselves to blame for not capitalising on a dominant performance. Gordon Schildenfeld and Mario Mandžukić were both guilty of bad misses and Dinamo's evening was summed up in the final minute when Ognjen Vukojević saw his effort cannon back off the post. Yet it was Basel that begun the brightest as they sought to build on their 1-0 victory against Stade Rennes a fortnight before. Scott Chipperfield was the instigator of much of their attacking play, and Daniel Majstorovic twice headed over crosses from the Australian when he should have done better. It proved a false dawn, however, and Dinamo soon found their rhythm as Mandžukić and Hrvoje Čale both tried their luck from distance. Ivan Ergić warmed Dinamo keeper George Koch's hands at the other end, though Basel found relief harder and harder to come by as the game went on. Midway through the first half Schildenfeld contrived to head Luka Modrić's corner wide, while Mandžukić, Vukojević and Franck Manga Guela all fired long-distance efforts off target. Costanzo was called upon soon after half-time to tip over Vukojević's curling effort and was on hand to collect Schildenfeld's header soon after. It was all Dinamo as Costanzo made further stops to deny substitute Carlos and then Mandžukić yet again. It was an evening to forget for the 21-year-old Mandžukić who headed a glorious chance wide and when Vukojević saw his effort hit the post, Dinamo knew their luck was out as Basel held on.

SK Brann
Basel then faced Brann at St. Jakob-Park on 5 December, where they won 1–0 through a Carlitos free-kick and were highly praised for playing attractive and flowing football. Both teams made enterprising starts, although chances were chiefly of the half variety, usually shots from range. Brann midfielder Petter Vaagan Moen and Carlitos traded such efforts before the Basel man broke the deadlock in the 39th minute. Having been fouled by Ramiro Corrales, Carlitos took the free-kick himself and fired beyond Håkon Opdal. The goalkeeper then had to be at his best to ensure Brann went in just a goal behind, diving to keep out a powerful Reto Zanni drive. The Norwegian champions pressed for an equaliser in the second half, but were largely frustrated by a Basel defence that was content to hold on to the narrow advantage. Joakim Sjöhage, Vaagan Moen and Huseklepp all had chances but Franco Costanzo was equal to all of them.

Hamburger SV
Basel then went to Germany to face Hamburger SV at the HSH Nordbank Arena on 20 December in front of 48,917 spectators under referee Nicolai Vollquartz from the Danish Football Association. Both clubs had already qualified for the knock out phase, and it was the home side who began better, Nigel de Jong meeting Rafael van der Vaart's free-kick with his head and forcing Franco Costanzo to save with his right foot before he reacted smartly to keep out Bastian Reinhardt's follow-up effort. The Basel goalkeeper held Hamburg at bay throughout the first half, despite the fact that Ivica Olić and Var der Vaart had three presentable chances in quick succession after about half-hours play. Because Basel playmaker Carlitos was well marked by the home defence, Basel struggled to create much in attack and their prospects looked bad when Reto Zanni brought down Vincent Kompany and then saw his second yellow card in the 50th minute. However, eight minutes later Ivan Ergić reacted fastest to push in Benjamin Huggel's mis-hit shot from a Michel Morganella cross. Just as Basel might have been thinking about holding on for the three points, Romeo Castelen raced down the right wing and crossed for the waiting Olić to shoot in the equaliser and ensured his side would finish above their opponents. Hamburger SV claimed first place Group D as Olić's late goal earned a 1-1 draw against ten-man FC Basel.

The draw for the round of 32 was held on Friday, 21 December 2007 at 13:00 CET in Nyon, Switzerland. The eight group winners were drawn against the eight third-placed teams, while the eight second-placed teams were drawn against the eight teams who finished third in the Champions League groups. Teams from the same group or the same country cannot be drawn together. Basel then faced Sporting CP in the round of 32 after qualifying in second position in the group alongside Hamburg and Brann. Sporting CP finished third in their group in the UEFA Champions League, which is why they were dropped into the UEFA Cup. 

Sporting CP
The first leg took place on the 13 February 2008 at the Estádio José Alvalade in Lisbon with referee Kevin Blom from Royal Dutch Football Association. The visitors almost went into the lead inside three minutes when Carlitos' corner came to captain Ivan Ergić whose header went just over. Instead it was Sporting who took went ahead in the eighth minute, Simon Vukčević finishing into the bottom corner after being set up by Leandro Romagnoli's neat pass. But that was a rare foray forward for the home side as Basel dominated possession early on. David Degen going closest to bringing them level with a volley which fizzed over. The visitors suffered a blow a minute before the break when goalkeeper Franco Costanzo was forced off with injury to be replaced by Liberia international Louis Crayton. Vukčević gave the new goalkeeper no chance as he doubled the lead after 58 minutes, drilling João Moutinho's right-wing cross high into the top corner from the right side of the area.

Return match
One week later, on 21 February 2008, the return leg did not fare any better for Basel. Costanzo was still out injured and Basel lost 3–0 in the home match, resulting in them being knocked out 5–0 on aggregate. The visitors enjoyed a perfect start at St. Jakob-Park when Bruno Pereirinha broke the deadlock after just two minutes. It left Basel needing to score four times. Sporting's keeper Rui Patrício was tested twice after quarter of an hour, first by Eduardo's long-range effort and then Eren Derdiyok's shot from the left side of the area. Patrício also blocked well to deny Ivan Ergić's volley from ten metres. Liédson ended home hopes with two goals either side of half-time.

Conclusion
This rounded off a highly successful season for Basel, as they conquered on the domestic front, winning both the Swiss Super League and Swiss Cup, and reaching the last 32 of the UEFA Cup. Basel achieved all of their aims. Next season they will have the opportunity to qualify for the 2008–09 UEFA Champions League.

Club

The Management

Kit

|
|

Other information

Players

First team squad

Multiple Nationality
 1   Franco Costanzo
 5   Daniel Majstorović
 9   Marko Perović
 11   Scott Chipperfield
 18   Louis Crayton
 22   Ivan Ergić
 24   Cabral
 28   Beg Ferati
 31   Eren Derdiyok

Transfers summer 2007

In

In on loan

Out

Out on loan

Transfers winter 2007-08

In

In on loan

Out

Out on loan

Results and fixtures

Friendly matches

Pre- and mid-season friendlies

Winter break and mid-season friendlies

Swiss Super League

First half of season

Second half of season

League table

Season progression chart

2007–08 Swiss Cup
for main article, see 2007–08 Swiss Cup

2007–08 UEFA Cup
For more information, see 2007–08 UEFA Cup

Second qualifying round
For more information, see 2007–08 UEFA Cup qualifying rounds

Basel win 6-1 on aggregate

First round

Group stage

Group D

Final table

Knockout stage

Sporting won 5–0 on aggregate.

Overall
Basel participated in the following major competitions: the Swiss Super League, the Swiss Cup and the UEFA Cup.

Statistics

Total goalscorers
Updated to games played 10 May 2008

Swiss Super League goalscorers/assists
Updated to games played 10 May 2008

Swiss Cup goalscorers
Updated to games played 6 April 2008

European goalscorers
Updated to games played 21 February 2008

Honours and awards

Swiss League Champions 2007-08
Swiss Cup Champions 2007-08
Swiss Youngster of the Year 2007/08 - Eren Derdiyok
Swiss Coach of the Year 2007/08 - Christian Gross

See also
 History of FC Basel
 List of FC Basel players
 List of FC Basel seasons

References

Sources
 Rotblau: Jahrbuch Saison 2017/2018. Publisher: FC Basel Marketing AG. 
 Die ersten 125 Jahre. Publisher: Josef Zindel im Friedrich Reinhardt Verlag, Basel. 
 FCB squad on homepage: Verein "Basler Fussballarchiv" homepage

External links
 Official site
 football.ch

FC Basel seasons
Basel
2007-08